Barbara Vernon may refer to:

 Barbara Vernon (activist), Australian maternity activist and government lobbyist
 Barbara Vernon (writer) (1916–1978), Australian playwright and screenwriter

See also
 Mary Barbara Bailey, (1910-2003) British artist and nun, née Barbara Vernon Bailey